Eastnor may refer to:

 Eastnor, Herefordshire, England
 Eastnor Castle, near Eastnor, Herefordshire
 Eastnor Township, Ontario
 Eastnor (Zimbabwe)